Geordie is a nickname for a person from the Tyneside area of North East England, and the dialect used by its inhabitants, also known in linguistics as Tyneside English or Newcastle English. There are different definitions of what constitutes a Geordie. The term is used and has been historically used to refer to the people of the North East. A Geordie can also specifically be a native of Tyneside (especially Newcastle upon Tyne) and the surrounding areas. Not everyone from the North East of England identifies as a Geordie.

Geordie is a continuation and development of the language spoken by Anglo-Saxon settlers, initially employed by the ancient Brythons to fight the Pictish invaders after the end of Roman rule in Britain in the 5th century. The Angles, Saxons and Jutes who arrived became ascendant politically and culturally over the native British through subsequent migration from tribal homelands along the North Sea coast of mainland Europe. The Anglo-Saxon kingdoms that emerged in the Dark Ages spoke largely mutually intelligible varieties of what is now called Old English, each varying somewhat in phonology, morphology, syntax, and lexicon. This linguistic conservatism means that poems by the Anglo-Saxon scholar the Venerable Bede translate more successfully into Geordie than into Standard English.

In Northern England and the Scottish borders, then dominated by the kingdom of Northumbria, there developed a distinct Northumbrian Old English dialect. Later Irish migrants possibly influenced Geordie phonology from the early 19th century onwards.

The British Library points out that the Norse, who primarily lived south of the River Tees, affected the language in Yorkshire but not in regions to the north. This source adds that "the border skirmishes that broke out sporadically during the Middle Ages meant the River Tweed established itself as a significant northern barrier against Scottish influence". Today, many who speak the Geordie dialect use words such as gan ('go' – modern German ) and bairn ('child' – modern Danish ) which "can still trace their roots right back to the Angles".

The word "Geordie" can refer to a supporter of Newcastle United. The Geordie Schooner glass was traditionally used to serve Newcastle Brown Ale.

The Geordie dialect and identity are primarily associated with those of a working-class background. A 2008 newspaper survey found the Geordie accent the "most attractive in England".

Geographical coverage

People
When referring to the people, as opposed to the dialect, dictionary definitions of a Geordie typically refer to a native or inhabitant of Newcastle upon Tyne, England, or its environs, an area that encompasses North Tyneside, Newcastle, South Tyneside and Gateshead. This area has a combined population of around 700,000, based on 2011 census-data.

The term itself, according to Brockett, originated from all the North East coal mines. The catchment area for the term "Geordie" can include Northumberland and County Durham or be confined to an area as small as the city of Newcastle upon Tyne and the metropolitan boroughs of Tyneside.

Scott Dobson, the author of the book Larn Yersel Geordie, once stated that his grandmother, who was brought up in Byker, thought the miners were the true Geordies. There is a theory the name comes from the Northumberland and Durham coal mines. Poems and songs written in this area in 1876 (according to the OED), speak of the "Geordie".

Dialect
Academics refer to the Geordie dialect as "Tyneside English".

According to the British Library, "Locals insist there are significant differences between Geordie and several other local dialects, such as Pitmatic and Mackem. Pitmatic is the dialect of the former mining areas in County Durham and around Ashington to the north of Newcastle upon Tyne, while Mackem is used locally to refer to the dialect of the city of Sunderland and the surrounding urban area of Wearside".

Etymology
A number of rival theories explain how the term "Geordie" came about, though all accept that it derives from a familiar diminutive form of the name George, "a very common name among the pitmen" (coal miners) in North East England; indeed, it was once the most popular name for eldest sons in the region.

One account traces the name to the times of the Jacobite Rebellion of 1715. The Jacobites declared that the natives of Newcastle were staunch supporters of the Hanoverian kings, whose first representative George I reigned (1714–1727) at the time of the 1715 rebellion. Newcastle contrasted with rural Northumberland, which largely supported the Jacobite cause. In this case, the term "Geordie" may have derived from the popular anti-Hanoverian song "Cam Ye O'er Frae France?", which calls the first Hanoverian king "Geordie Whelps", a play on "George the Guelph".

Another explanation for the name states that local miners in the northeast of England used Geordie safety lamps, designed by George Stephenson, known locally as "Geordie the engine-wright", in 1815 rather than the competing Davy lamps, designed about the same time by Humphry Davy and used in other mining communities. Using the chronological order of two John Trotter Brockett books, Geordie was given to North East pitmen; later he acknowledges that the pitmen also christened their Stephenson lamp Geordie.

Linguist Katie Wales also dates the term earlier than does the current Oxford English Dictionary; she observes that Geordy (or Geordie) was a common name given to coal-mine pitmen in ballads and songs of the region, noting that such usage turns up as early as 1793. It occurs in the titles of two songs by songwriter Joe Wilson: "Geordy, Haud the Bairn" and "Keep your Feet Still, Geordie". Citing such examples as the song "Geordy Black", written by Rowland Harrison of Gateshead, she contends that, as a consequence of popular culture, the miner and the keelman had become icons of the region in the 19th century, and "Geordie" was a label that "affectionately and proudly reflected this," replacing the earlier ballad emblem, the figure of Bob Crankie.

In the English Dialect Dictionary of 1900, Joseph Wright gave as his fourth definition of "Geordie": A man from Tyneside; a miner; a north-country collier vessel, quoting two sources from Northumberland, one from East Durham and one from Australia.  The source from Durham stated: "In South Tyneside even, this name was applied to the Lower Tyneside men."

Newcastle publisher Frank Graham's Geordie Dictionary states:

In Graham's many years of research, the earliest record he found of the term's use dated to 1823 by local comedian Billy Purvis. Purvis had set up a booth at the Newcastle Races on the Town Moor. In an angry tirade against a rival showman, who had hired a young pitman called Tom Johnson to dress as a clown, Billy cried out to the clown:

(Rough translation: "Oh man, who but a fool would have sold off his furniture and left his wife? Now, you're a fair downright fool, not an artificial fool like Billy Purvis! You're a real Geordie! Go on, man, and hide yourself! Go on and get your picks [axes] again. You may do for the city, but never for the west end of our town!")

John Camden Hotten wrote in 1869: "Geordie, general term in Northumberland and Durham for a pitman, or coal-miner. Origin not known; the term has been in use more than a century." Using Hotten as a chronological reference, Geordie has been documented for at least  years as a term related to Northumberland and County Durham.

The name Bad-weather Geordy applied to cockle sellers:

Travel writer Scott Dobson used the term "Geordieland" in a 1973 guidebook to refer collectively to Northumberland and Durham.

Linguistic surveys
The Survey of English Dialects included Earsdon and Heddon-on-the-Wall in its fieldwork, administering more than 1000 questions to local informants.

The Linguistic Survey of Scotland included Cumberland and Northumberland (using pre-1974 boundaries) in its scope, collecting words through postal questionnaires. Tyneside sites included Cullercoats, Earsdon, Forest Hall, Gosforth, Newcastle upon Tyne, Wallsend-on-Tyne and Whitley Bay.

Phonology

Other scholars may use different transcriptions. Watt and Allen stated that there were approximately 800,000 people in the early 2000s who spoke this form of British English.Tyneside English (TE) is spoken in Newcastle upon Tyne, a city of around 260,000 inhabitants in the far north of England, and in the conurbation stretching east and south of Newcastle along the valley of the River Tyne as far as the North Sea. The total population of this conurbation, which also subsumes Gateshead, Jarrow, North and South Shields, Whitley Bay, and Tynemouth, exceeds 800,000.

Consonants
Geordie consonants generally follow those of Received Pronunciation, with these unique characteristics as follows:

 The Geordie accent does not use the glottal stop in a usual fashion. It is characterised by a unique type of glottal stops.  can all be pronounced simultaneously with a glottal stop after them in Geordie, both at the end of a syllable and sometimes before a weak vowel.
 Glottaling in Geordie is known as 'pre-glottalisation', which is 'an occlusion at the appropriate place of articulation and 'glottalisation', usually manifested as a short period of laryngealised voice before and/or after and often also during the stop gap'. This type of glottal is unique to Tyneside English.
 Other voiceless stops, are glottally reinforced in medial position, and preaspirated in final position.
 The dialect is non-rhotic, like most British dialects, most commonly as an alveolar approximant , although a labiodental realisation  is also growing for younger females (this is also possible by older males, albeit rarer). Traditionally, intrusive R was not present, instead glottalising between boundaries, however is present in newer varieties.
 Yod-coalescence in both stressed and unstressed syllables (so that dew becomes ).
  is traditionally clear in all contexts, meaning the velarised allophone is absent. However, modern accents may periodically use  in syllable final positions, sometimes it may even be vocalised (as in bottle ).

Vowels

 Length
 For some speakers, vowel length alternates with vowel quality in a very similar way to the Scottish vowel length rule.
Another  appears as an allophone of  before final voiced consonants in words such as lad .

 Phonetic quality and phonemic incidence
However, younger women tend to use a central  instead.
 The  vowel is tense  and is best analysed as belonging to the  phoneme.
 As other Northern English varieties, Geordie lacks the - split, so that words like cut, up and luck have the same  phoneme as put, sugar and butcher. The typical phonetic realisation is unrounded , but it may be hypercorrected to  among middle-class (especially female) speakers.
The opening diphthongs are recessive, as younger speakers reject them in favour of the monophthongal .
An RP-like vowel  is also possible.
 The schwa  is often rather open. It also tends to be longer in duration than the preceding stressed vowel, even if that vowel is phonologically long. This feature is shared with the very conservative (Upper Crust) variety of Received Pronunciation.
That does not mean that Geordie has undergone the weak vowel merger because  can still be found in some unstressed syllables in place of the more usual . An example of that is the second syllable of seven , but it can also be pronounced with a simple schwa  instead.
 As in other Northern English dialects, the  vowel is short  in Geordie, thus there is no London-style trap-bath split. There are a small number of exceptions to this rule; for instance, half, master, plaster and sometimes also disaster are pronounced with the  vowel .
 Older traditional Geordie does not always adhere to the same distributional patters of vowels found in standard varieties of English.

 Diphthongs
Traditionally, this whole vowel was a high monophthong  (with town being pronounced close to RP toon) and this pronunciation can still be heard, as can a narrower diphthong  (with town being pronounced close to RP tone).
Thus  is used in words such as knife , whereas  is used in knives .

Vocabulary

The Geordie dialect shares similarities with other Northern English dialects, as well as with the Scots language (See Rowe 2007, 2009).

Dorfy, real name Dorothy Samuelson-Sandvid, was a noted Geordie dialect writer. In her column for the South Shields Gazette, Samuelson-Sandvid attests many samples of Geordie language usage, such as the nouns bairn ("child") and clarts ("mud"); the adjectives canny ("pleasant") and clag ("sticky"); and the imperative verb phrase howay ("hurry up!"; "come on!")

Howay is broadly comparable to the invocation "Come on!" or the French "Allez-y!" ("Go on!"). Examples of common use include Howay man!, meaning "come on" or "hurry up", Howay the lads! as a term of encouragement for a sports team for example (the players' tunnel at St James' Park has this phrase just above the entrance to the pitch), or Ho'way!? (with stress on the second syllable) expressing incredulity or disbelief. The literal opposite of this phrase is haddaway ("go away"); although not as common as howay, it is perhaps most commonly used in the phrase "Haddaway an' shite" (Tom Hadaway, Figure 5.2 Haddaway an' shite; 'Cursing like sleet blackening the buds, raging at the monk of Jarrow scribbling his morality and judgement into a book.').

Another word, divvie or divvy ("idiot"), seems to come from the Co-op dividend, or from the two Davy lamps (the more explosive Scotch Davy used in 1850, commission disapproved of its use in 1886 (inventor not known, nicknamed Scotch Davy probably given by miners after the Davy lamp was made perhaps by north east miners who used the Stephenson Lamp), and the later better designed Davy designed by Humphry Davy also called the Divvy.) As in a north east miner saying 'Marra, ye keep way from me if ye usin a divvy.' It seems the word divvie then translated to daft lad/lass. Perhaps coming from the fact one would be seen as foolish going down a mine with a Scotch Divvy when there are safer lamps available, like the Geordie, or the Davy.

The Geordie word netty, meaning a toilet and place of need and necessity for relief or bathroom, has an uncertain origin, though some have theorised that it may come from slang used by Roman soldiers on Hadrian's Wall, which may have later become gabinetti in the Romance language Italian (such as in the Westoe Netty, the subject of a famous painting from Bob Olley). However, gabbinetto is the Modern Italian diminutive of gabbia, which actually derives from the Latin cavea ("hollow", "cavity", "enclosure"), the root of the loanwords that became the Modern English cave, cage, and gaol. Thus, another explanation would be that it comes from a Modern Italian form of the word gabinetti, though only a relatively small number of Italians have migrated to the North of England, mostly during the 19th century.

Some etymologists connect the word netty to the Modern English word needy. John Trotter Brockett, writing in 1829 in his A glossary of north country words..., claims that the etymon of netty (and its related form neddy) is the Modern English needy and need.

Bill Griffiths, in A Dictionary of North East Dialect, points to the earlier form, the Old English níd; he writes: "MS locates a possible early ex. "Robert Hovyngham sall make... at the other end of his house a knyttyng" York 1419, in which case the root could be OE níd 'necessary'". Another related word, nessy is thought (by Griffiths) to derive from the Modern English "necessary".

A poem called "Yam" narrated by author Douglas Kew, demonstrates the usage of a number of Geordie words.

References

Sources

External links

 Newcastle English (Geordie)
 Sounds Familiar?– Listen to examples of Geordie and other regional accents and dialects of the UK on the British Library's 'Sounds Familiar' website
 'Hover & Hear' Geordie pronunciations, and compare side by side with other accents from the UK and around the World.
 The Geordie Directory – Find out about & learn the Geordie accent
 Geordie dialect words on Wikibooks

Culture in Tyne and Wear
Languages of the United Kingdom
English language in England
British regional nicknames
People from Tyne and Wear
North East England
City colloquials